"Ain't Love a Good Thing" is a single by American country music artist Connie Smith. Released in September 1973, the song reached #10 on the Billboard Hot Country Singles chart. The song was issued onto Smith's 1974 studio album entitled That's the Way Love Goes. The single became Smith's first major hit and first top ten single under Columbia Records. Additionally, "Ain't Love a Good Thing" reached #12 on the Canadian RPM Country Tracks chart.

Chart performance

Cover versions 
The New Coon Creek Girls on Ain't Love a Good Thing (1995)
Ricky Skaggs on Life Is a Journey (1997)

References 

1973 singles
Connie Smith songs
Songs written by Dallas Frazier
Song recordings produced by Ray Baker (music producer)
1973 songs
Columbia Records singles